The Španji or Shpani were a medieval Albanian clan or fis. They inhabited the region of Nikšić and the valley of the river Zeta in modern-day Montenegro, while also being widespread around Shkodër and Pult. According to folk legends, they were the oldest tribe in the region, while also being in frequent conflict with many other tribes such as the Macure or Bukumiri.  
They are commonly treated as one of the non-Slavic, "Old Balkanic" people that were assimilated (Slavicized) into the Serb ethnos. Serbianisation of the Španji and other tribes in the region began in the 6th and 7th centuries and according to M. Radovanović (2004) was completed when Serbs from surrounding regions retreated to the mountains of Montenegro and Herzegovina because of the 14th- and 15th century Ottoman invasion.

The Špani were quite a rich clan, and their riches flourished in Albania; in the 1416–1417 cadastre of Shkodra many Špani (Shpani) are mentioned, being prevalent in the suburbs of Shkodra and owning land and villages, while also reaping privileges from Venetian possessions.

The Albanian Spani family active in Shkodër and Drivast in the beginning of 14th century originated from the clan.  This connection has also been supported by V. Ćorović. The toponyms Španjska gradina (in Spuž) and Španjsko katunište on mount Vražegrmac derive from the tribal name. Š. Kulišić derived their name from Old Greek , meaning 'naked', which might have been used by Greeks for the Illyrian inhabitants of the "naked" karst mountains; similarly, the name Pješivci derives from Slavic plješiv meaning 'bald', and could have been attributed to the inhabitants of those "naked" mountains (in Serbian, the demonym would be ).

Annotations

References

Sources 

 
 
  
 
 
 
 
 

Tribes of Montenegro